Topaze is the designation of a French sounding rocket. The Topaze was developed by several French companies, notably Nord Aviation and Sud Aviation, and built by SEREB (a joint venture of Nord and Sud, now known as Aérospatiale) and was the first guidable French sounding rocket. The Topaze was launched 14 times from the CIEES launch site in Hammaguir, Algeria, by ONERA.

There were two versions of the Topaze:

Topaze VE111C
payload mass: 410 kg (900 lb)
total mass: 2900 kg (6400 lb)
length: 7.07 m (23.2 ft)
range: 80 km (49 mi)
liftoff thrust: 120.0 kN

There were six launches between 19 December 1962 and 24 October 1963, reaching an apogee of 80 km (49 mi).

 Topaze VE111L
payload mass: 360 kg (840 lb)
total mass: 3434 kg (7570 lb)
length: 7.90 m (25.9 ft)
range: 110 km (68 mi)
liftoff thrust 147.0 kN

This version was launched eight times between 21 December 1963 and 21 May 1965, with apogees ranging from 60 km (37 mi) to 110 km (68 mi).

The Topaze was also used as the second stage of the Diamant rocket, the launch vehicle for France's first satellite, the Asterix-1, and the Saphir rocket.

References

Sounding rockets of France